Chrysoeriol is a flavone, chemically the 3'-methoxy derivative of luteolin.

Related compounds 
Diosmetin is one of three possible regioisomers of chrysoeriol.

Natural sources 
Found in Artemisia.

Pharmacodynamics 
Vasorelaxant and hypotensive activity in vitro and in vivo in a murine model by intravenous infusion.

See also 
 Cannflavins, prenylated derivatives of chrysoeriol

References

External links 
 Artemisia copa aqueous extract as vasorelaxant and hypotensive agent

O-methylated flavones